Giuseppe Michael Agrelot Vilá (April 21, 1927 – January 28, 2004), also known as José Miguel Agrelot or Don Cholito, was a Puerto Rican comedian, radio and television host.

Biography
Agrelot was born in Santurce, Puerto Rico. He was the third of four children of Felipe Antonio Agrelot Fittipaldi and Ana Luisa Vilá Cruz. His paternal grandparents were born in Lauria, Italy and immigrated to Puerto Rico in 1892, two years before his father’s birth. His sister, Ana Luisa, a teacher, later became a part-time comedic actress as well. He started working on radio stations when he was 14. At that time, he was employed by radio entrepreneur  Tomás Muñiz, then the general manager of WIAC-AM and the father of later producer and actor Tommy Muñiz. During this period Agrelot developed his first comedic character, Torito Fuertes, a mischievous eight-year-old for a family comedy  show sponsored by Borden, Inc. and its evaporated milk (the name Torito Fuertes was a pun on "strong calf", a desirable consequence of drinking good milk). The character later took a life of his own on a radio show first named El Profesor Colgate (sponsored by Colgate-Palmolive's flagship toothpaste) and later called El Colegio de la Alegría (The School of Joy). This program featured Tommy Muñiz as the schoolteacher of a rather dysfunctional classroom.

Apart from appearances in numerous commercials, Agrelot's credits in Puerto Rican television   included:

La Criada Malcriada (The Rude Maid)
El Especial de Corona (The Corona Special)
Desafiando a los Genios (Challenging The Geniuses), a personal favorite of Pablo Casals
Haciendo Historia (Making History)
El Show del Mediodia (The Midday show, as Don Cholito, another legendary character of his)
Parece Increible (It Seems Incredible)
Ja ja, Ji ji, Jo jo con Agrelot

Exhibition boxing record

Comedic characters
Agrelot created the following characters:

"Don Pulula", a mild mannered evangelical pastor with a proclivity for mild double entendres (he modeled his voice after that of Rafael Quiñones Vidal, a Puerto Rican television host),
"Mario Trauma", a crazed mental patient who constantly screamed in falsetto and was in reality saner than the people around him (he modeled his voice after a floor coordinator at WAPA-TV),
"Pasión", an old maid desperately looking for male company,
"Serafín Sin Fin y Sin Meta", an effeminate man with a heart-shaped birthmark in his cheek  (while claiming that Serafín was not a homosexual and never made a pass to anyone during the character's run, Agrelot faced protests from the local chapter of GLAAD and discontinued the character)
"Soldado Manteca", an inept Beetle Bailey-like character who was part of the United States Army (Agrelot described him once as Torito Fuertes, all grown up)
"Cerebrito Ligón", a man who claimed to be a peeping Tom but wouldn't dare to peep. A famous episode had a young Alida Arizmendi, later a Puerto Rican legislator, confronting him while he tried to sneak into an all-female gym;
"Speedy González", an extremely fast gibberish-talking handyman, who would always charge US$10.00 for his services (later increased to US$20.00 because of inflation). This character was a favorite of Benicio del Toro's.
"Don Remigio Rodríguez y Rodriguez", an almost catatonic, extremely frank businessman (and the owner of Rodríguez y Rodriguez Sociedad en Comandita) who had a proclivity for face gestures and sticking out his tongue. He had a standing feud with Joaquín, the Spanish-born store owner across the street (played by Spanish actor Ricardo Fabregues), to whom he constantly insulted ("¡Joaquín, pillo!") Don Rodríguez later starred in Sunshine Logroño's film, "Chona, La Puerca Asesina"
El Juez, a character modeled after Pigmeat Markham and Sammy Davis, Jr.'s "Here Come Da Judge" character (more Davis' than Markham's) who had a huge mallet and would use it against a defendant's head if necessary during trials
Don Segismundo, the mayor of Trujillo Bajo, a fictional municipality in Puerto Rico (Agrelot said once that Segismundo was actually Don Rodríguez y Rodríguez turned public servant)
"Pancho Matanzas", a Cuban immigrant that, as many did at the time, would sell anything to support himself and his family.
"Juan Macana", a not-very-bright police officer, PRPD badge number 13,378 who popularized in Puerto Rico a phrase Agrelot constantly heard in Mexico during one of his tours: "Sí, ¿cómo no?" ("Yeah, why not?")

Agrelot would also parody famous characters from film and cinema in his comedy program, "Ja Ja, Ji Ji, Jo Jo Con Agrelot". His most famous parody was that of Marlon Brando as Vito Corleone in The Godfather movie trilogy.

Agrelot appeared as Padre Ambrosio, a priest, in Jacobo Morales's Dios Los Cria II. He also played a serious dramatic role in a television miniseries, Nadie lo va a saber, in 1991.

See also 

List of Puerto Ricans

References
Exponen restos de Agrelot en funeraria Buxeda. San Juan, Puerto Rico: El Nuevo Día. January 29, 2004.

External links

Online Discography

1927 births
2004 deaths
Male actors from San Juan, Puerto Rico
Puerto Rican comedians
Puerto Rican male actors
Puerto Rican people of Italian descent
Puerto Rican radio personalities
Puerto Rican television personalities
Television pioneers
20th-century American comedians
20th-century Puerto Rican male actors